Triple H is a South Korean musical group formed by Cube Entertainment. The group consisted of Hyuna and Pentagon members Hui and E'Dawn. As a group they released two extended plays, 199X (2017) and Retro Futurism (2018). Cube has confirmed that Hyuna and E'Dawn are no longer a part of the company after a released statement of them dating.

Career

2017: Debut with 199X
In March 2017, Cube Entertainment announced that Hyuna had formed a project group with unnamed label mates, that was set to debut in May. On April 4, Cube Entertainment announced that Hui and E'Dawn from the boyband Pentagon were the other members of the group, which would be called Triple H, and that they would star in a reality show called Triple H Fun Agency.

On May 1, Triple H released their first extended play, 199X, along with the single "365 Fresh" and its music video. The EP reached #4 on the Gaon Album Chart and #10 on the Billboard World Albums Chart. The music video for "365 Fresh" was the subject of controversy due to its depictions of sex, suicide, and crime.

2018: Retro Futurism and departures
In June 2018, Cube Entertainment announced that Triple H would be making a comeback in July. On July 18, Triple H released their second extended play, Retro Futurism, accompanied by a music video for the single, "Retro Future". The EP reached #8 on the Gaon Album Chart.

On August 2, 2018, Hyuna revealed that she had been dating E'Dawn since May 2016. On September 13, Cube Entertainment announced that they would be terminating their contracts, citing that they could not "maintain trust" with them. However, Cube announced that they would still remain in discussion with both of them until further notice. On October 5, a related source reported Hyuna and E'Dawn confirmed their departures from Cube Entertainment. On October 15, Cube Entertainment officially confirmed Hyuna's departure. On November 14, Cube Entertainment officially confirmed E'Dawn's departure.

Discography

Extended plays

Singles

Notes

References

K-pop music groups
Musical groups established in 2017
South Korean dance music groups
Cube Entertainment artists
South Korean idol groups
South Korean pop music groups
Hyuna
Hui (singer)
Pentagon (South Korean band)
South Korean musical trios
2018 disestablishments in South Korea
Musical groups disestablished in 2018
South Korean co-ed groups
2017 establishments in South Korea